An earring is a piece of jewelry attached to the ear via a piercing in the earlobe or another external part of the ear (except in the case of clip earrings, which clip onto the lobe). Earrings have been worn by people in different civilizations and historic periods, often with cultural significance.

Locations for piercings other than the earlobe include the rook, tragus, and across the helix (see image at right). The simple term "ear piercing" usually refers to an earlobe piercing, whereas piercings in the upper part of the external ear are often referred to as "cartilage piercings". Cartilage piercings are more complex to perform than earlobe piercings and take longer to heal.

Earring components may be made of any number of materials, including metal, plastic, glass, precious stone, beads, wood, bone, and other materials. Designs range from small hoops and studs to large plates and dangling items. The size is ultimately limited by the physical capacity of the earlobe to hold the earring without tearing. However, heavy earrings worn over extended periods of time may lead to stretching of the earlobe and the piercing.

History

Ear piercing is one of the oldest known forms of body modification, with artistic and written references from cultures around the world dating back to early history. Gold earrings, along with other jewelry made of gold, lapis lazuli, and carnelian were found in the ancient sites in Lothal, India, and Sumerian Royal Cemetery at Ur from the Early Dynastic period. Gold, silver and bronze hoop earrings were prevalent in the Minoan Civilization (2000–1600 BCE) and examples can be seen on frescoes on the Aegean island of Santorini, Greece. During the late Minoan and early Mycenaean periods of Bronze Age Greece hoop earrings with conical pendants were fashionable. Early evidence of earrings worn by men can be seen in archeological evidence from Persepolis in ancient Persia. The carved images of soldiers of the Persian Empire, displayed on some of the surviving walls of the palace, show them wearing an earring.

Howard Carter writes in his description of Tutankhamun's tomb that the Pharaoh's earlobes were perforated, but no earrings were inside the wrappings, although the tomb contained some. The burial mask's ears were perforated as well, but the holes were covered with golden discs. That implies that at the time, earrings were only worn in Egypt by children, much like in Egypt of Carter's times.

Other early evidence of earring-wearing is evident in the Biblical record. In Exodus 32:1–4, it is written that while Moses was up on Mount Sinai, the Israelites demanded that Aaron make a god for them. It is written that he commanded them to bring their sons' and daughters' earrings (and other pieces of jewelry) to him in order that he might comply with their demand. By the classical period, including in the Middle East, as a general rule, they were considered exclusively female ornaments. During certain periods in Greece and Rome also, earrings were worn mainly by women, though they were popular among men in early periods and had resurfaced later on, as famous figures like Plato were known to have worn them.

The practice of wearing earrings was a tradition for Ainu men and women, but the Government of Meiji Japan forbade Ainu men to wear earrings in the late-19th century. Earrings were also commonplace among nomadic Turkic tribes and Korea. Lavish ear ornaments have remained popular in India from ancient times to the present day. And it was common that men and women wear earrings during Silla, Goryeo to Joseon.

In Western Europe, earrings became fashionable among English courtiers and gentlemen in the 1590s during the English Renaissance. A document published in 1577 by clergyman William Harrison, Description of England, states "Some lusty courtiers and gentlemen of courage do wear either rings of gold, stones or pearls in their ears." Among sailors, a pierced earlobe was a symbol that the wearer had sailed around the world or had crossed the equator.

By the late 1950s or early 1960s, the practice re-emerged in the Western world. Teenage girls were known to hold ear piercing parties, where they performed the procedure on one another. By the mid-1960s, some physicians offered ear piercing as a service. Simultaneously, Manhattan jewelry stores were some of the earliest commercial, non-medical locations for getting an ear piercing.

In the late 1960s, ear piercing began to make inroads among men through the hippie and gay communities, although they had been popular among sailors for decades (or longer). 

By the early 1970s, ear piercing was common among women, thus creating a broader market for the procedure. Department stores throughout the country would hold ear piercing events, sponsored by earring manufacturers. At these events, a nurse or other trained person would perform the procedure, either pushing a sharpened and sterilized starter earring through the earlobe by hand, or using an ear-piercing instrument modified from the design used by physicians.

In the late 1970s, amateur piercings, sometimes with safety pins or multiple piercings, became popular in the punk rock community. By the 1980s, the trend for male popular music performers to have pierced ears helped establish a fashion trend for men. This was later adopted by many professional athletes. British men started piercing both ears in the 1980s; George Michael of Wham! was a prominent example. During wham! he frequently wore small gold hoop earrings. When he then went on the become a solo artist with his iconic debut album "Faith" he wore a cross earring on his left ear. As of now,  it is widely acceptable for teenage and pre-teen boys to have both ears pierced as well simply as a fashion statement. 

Multiple piercings in one or both ears first emerged in mainstream America in the 1970s. Initially, the trend was for women to wear a second set of earrings in the earlobes, or for men to double-pierce a single earlobe. Asymmetric styles with more and more piercings became popular, eventually leading to the cartilage piercing trend. Double ear piercing in newborn babies is a phenomenon in Central America, in particular in Costa Rica.

A variety of specialized cartilage piercings have since become popular. These include the tragus piercing, antitragus piercing, rook piercing, industrial piercing, helix piercing, orbital piercing, daith piercing, and conch piercing. In addition, earlobe stretching, while common in indigenous cultures for thousands of years, began to appear in Western society in the 1990s, and is now a fairly common sight. However, these forms of ear piercing are still infrequent compared to standard ear piercing.

Religious
According to Hindu dharma tradition, most girls and some boys (especially the "twice-born") get their ears pierced as part of a Dharmic rite known as Karnavedha before they are about five years old. Infants may get their ears pierced as early as several days after their birth.

Similar customs  are practiced in other Asian countries, including Nepal, Sri Lanka, and Laos, although traditionally most males wait to get their ears pierced until they have reached young adulthood.

Ear piercing is mentioned in the Bible in several contexts. The most familiar refers to a Hebrew slave who was to be freed in the seventh year of servitude but wishes to continue serving his master and refuses to go free: "…his master shall take him before God. He shall be brought to the door or the doorpost, and his master shall pierce his ear with an awl, and he shall then remain his slave for life" (Exodus 21:6).

Types of earrings

Modern standard pierced earrings

Barbell earrings
Barbell earrings get their name from their resemblance to a barbell, generally coming in the form of a metal bar with an orb on either end. One of these orbs is affixed in place, while the other can be detached to allow the barbell to be inserted into a piercing. Several variations on this basic design exist, including barbells with curves or angles in the bar of the earring.

Claw earrings
The claw, talon  or pincher is essentially a curved taper which is worn in stretched ear lobe piercings. The thickest end is generally flared and may be decorated, and a rubber o-ring may also be used to prevent the talon from becoming dislodged when worn. Common materials include acrylic and glass. A similar item of jewelry is the crescent, or pincher, which as the name suggests, is shaped like a crescent moon and is tapered at both ends. Talons and claws may also be quite ornamental (e.g.: carved in the form of a serpent or dragon). Consequently, they may prove to be an impractical choice of jewelry as they may snag on hair, clothing, etc.

Statement earrings
Statement earrings can be defined as "earrings which invite attention from others by demonstrating bold, original, and unique designs with innovative construction and material combinations". They include one or more of the following design features:

Dangles
Tassels
Sparkles
Bold or striking colours
Hoops

Stud/minimal earrings
The main characteristic of stud earrings is the appearance of floating on the ear or earlobe without a visible (from the front) point of connection. Studs are invariably constructed on the end of a post, which penetrates straight through the ear or earlobe. The post is held in place by a removable friction back or clutch (also known as a butterfly scroll). A stud earring features a gemstone or other ornament mounted on a narrow post that passes through a piercing in the ear or earlobe, and is held in place by a fixture on the other side. Studs commonly come in the form of solitaire diamonds. Some stud earrings are constructed so that the post is threaded, allowing a screw back to hold the earring in place securely, which is useful in preventing the loss of expensive earrings containing precious stones, or made of precious metals.

Hoop earrings
Hoop earrings are circular or semi-circular in design and look very similar to a ring. Hoop earrings generally come in the form of a hoop of metal that can be opened to pass through the ear piercing. They are often constructed of metal tubing, with a thin wire attachment penetrating the ear. The hollow tubing is permanently attached to the wire at the front of the ear, and slips into the tube at the back. The entire device is held together by tension between the wire and the tube. Other hoop designs do not complete the circle, but penetrate through the ear in a post, using the same attachment techniques that apply to stud earrings. A variation is the continuous hoop earring. In this design, the earring is constructed of a continuous piece of solid metal, which penetrates through the ear and can be rotated almost 360°. One of the ends is permanently attached to a small piece of metallic tubing or a hollow metallic bead. The other end is inserted into the tubing or bead, and is held in place by tension. One special type of hoop earring is the sleeper earring, a circular wire normally made of gold, with a diameter of approximately one centimeter. Hinged sleepers, which were common in Britain in the 1960s and 1970s, comprise two semi-circular gold wires connected via a tiny hinge at one end, and fastened via a small clasp at the other, to form a continuous hoop whose fastening mechanism is effectively invisible to the naked eye. Because their small size makes them unobtrusive and comfortable, and because they are normally otherwise unadorned, sleepers are so-called because they were intended to be worn at night to keep a pierced ear from closing, and were often the choice for the first set of earrings immediately following the ear piercing in the decades before ear-piercing guns using studs became commonplace, but are often a fashion choice in themselves because of their attractive simplicity and because they subtly call attention to the fact that the ear is pierced.

A drop earring attaches to the earlobe and features a gemstone or ornament that dangles down from a chain, hoop, or similar object. The length of these ornaments vary from the very short to the extravagantly long. Such earrings are occasionally known as droplet earrings, dangle earrings, or pendant earrings. They also include chandelier earrings, which branch out into elaborate, multi-level pendants.

Dangle earrings

Dangle earrings (also known as drop earrings) are designed to suspend from the bottoms of the earlobes. Their lengths vary from a centimeter or two, all the way to brushing the wearer's shoulders. A pierced dangle earring is generally attached to the ear with a thin wire passing through the earlobe. It may connect to itself with a small hook at the back, or in the French hook design, the wire passes through the earlobe piercing without closure, although small plastic or silicone retainers are sometimes used on ends. Rarely, dangle earrings use the post attachment design. There are also variants that attach without piercing.

Huggy earrings
Huggy earrings are hoops that closely follow the curve of the earlobe, instead of dangling down beneath it as in regular hoop earrings. Commonly, stones are channel set in huggy earrings.

Ear thread
Ear thread, or earthreader, ear string, or threader earrings, are a chain that is thin enough to slip into the ear hole, dangling down at the back. Sometimes, people add beads or other materials onto the chain, so the chain dangles with beads below the ear.

Jhumka earrings
A type of dangling bell-shaped traditional earrings mostly worn by women of Indian subcontinent.

Chandelier earrings
Chandelier earrings have an appearance similar to that of chandeliers, with a design that dangles below the ear and is wider at the base than the top.

Body piercing jewelry used as earrings

Body piercing jewelry is often used for ear piercings, and is selected for a variety of reasons including the availability of larger gauges, better piercing techniques, and a reduced risk of healing complications.
 Captive bead rings – Captive bead rings, often abbreviated as CBRs and sometimes called ball closure rings, are a style of body piercing jewelry that is an almost 360° ring with a small gap for insertion through the ear. The gap is closed with a small bead that is held in place by the ring's tension. Larger gauge ball closure rings exhibit considerable tension, and may require ring expanding pliers for insertion and removal of the bead.
 Barbells – Barbells are composed of a thin, straight metal rod with a bead permanently fixed to one end. The other end is threaded, either externally or tapped with an internal thread, and the other bead is screwed into place after the barbell is inserted through the ear. Since the threads on externally threaded barbells tend to irritate the piercing, internal threads have become the most common variety. Another variation are threadless barbells or press-fit jewelry, with a hollow post, a fixed back disk and a front end that is attached with a slightly bend pin that is inserted into the post. 
 Circular barbells – Circular barbells are similar to ball-closure rings, except that they have a larger gap, and have a permanently attached bead at one end, and a threaded bead at the other, like barbells. This allows for much easier insertion and removal than with ball closure rings, but at the loss of a continuous look.
 Plugs – Earplugs are short cylindrical pieces of jewelry. Some plugs have flared ends to hold them in place, others require small elastic rubber rings (O-rings) to keep them from falling out. They are usually used in large-gauge piercings.
 Flesh tunnels – Flesh tunnels, also known as eyelets or bullet holes, are similar to plugs; however, they are hollow in the middle. Flesh tunnels are most commonly used in larger gauge piercings either because weight is a concern to the wearer or for aesthetic reasons.

Gauges and other measuring systems
For an explanation of how earring sizes are denoted, see the article Body jewelry sizes.

Clip-on and other non-pierced earrings

Several varieties of non-pierced earrings exist.
 Clip-on earrings – Clip-on earrings have existed longer than any other variety of non-pierced earrings. The clip itself is a two-part piece attached to the back of an earring. The two pieces closed around the earlobe, using mechanical pressure to hold the earring in place.
 Magnetic earrings – Magnetic earrings simulate the look of a (pierced) stud earring by attaching to the earlobe with a magnetic back that hold the earring in place on by magnetic force.
 Stick-on earrings – Stick-on earrings are adhesive-backed items which stick to the skin of the earlobe and simulate the look of a (pierced) stud earring. They are considered a novelty item.
 Spring hoop earrings – Spring hoops are almost indistinguishable from standard hoop earrings and stay in place by means of spring force.
 An alternative which is often used is bending a wire or even just using the ring portion of a CBR to put on the earlobe, which stays on by pinching the ear
 Ear hook earrings – A large hook like the fish hook that is big enough to hook and hang over the whole ear and dangles.
 The hoop – A hoop threads over the ear and hangs from just inside the ear, above where ears are pierced. Mobiles or other dangles can be hung from the hoop to create a variety of styles.
 Ear screws – Screwed onto the lobe, allow for exact adjustment—an alternative for those who find clips too painful.
  – Wrap around the outer cartilage (similar to a conch piercing) and may be chained to a lobe piercing.

Permanent earrings
Where most earrings worn in the western world are designed to be removed easily to be changed at will, earrings can also be permanent (non-removable). They were once used as a mark of slavery or ownership. They appear today in the form of larger gauge rings which are difficult or impossible for a person to remove without assistance. Occasionally, hoop earrings are permanently installed by the use of solder, though this poses some risks due to toxicity of metals used in soldering and the risk of burns from the heat involved. Besides permanent installations, locking earrings are occasionally worn due to their personal symbolism or erotic value.

Ear piercing
Pierced ears are earlobes or the cartilage portion of the external ears which have had one or more holes created in them for the wearing of earrings. The holes may be permanent or temporary. The holes become permanent when a fistula is created by scar tissue forming around the initial earring.

Conch piercing
A conch piercing is a perforation of the part of the external human ear called the "concha", for the purpose of inserting and wearing jewelry. Conch piercings have become popular among young women in recent decades as part of a trend for multiple ear piercings.

Helix piercing
The helix piercing is a perforation of the helix or upper ear cartilage for the purpose of inserting and wearing a piece of jewelry.  The piercing itself is usually made with a small gauge hollow piercing needle, and typical jewelry would be a small diameter captive bead ring, or a stud.

Sometimes, two helix piercings hold the same piece of jewelry, usually a barbell, which is called an industrial piercing.

The information that helix piercings do not have nerve endings and do not hurt is completely false. They do hurt like any other cartilage piercing and bumping or tugging on them by accident during healing can be extremely painful. However, when they are left alone and not being irritated or touched, they typically do not hurt at all. Being careful of shifting the piercing at all during healing, which can take 6 to 9 months, is essential.

Snug piercing
A snug (or antihelix) piercing is a piercing which passes through the anti-helix of the ear from the medial to lateral surfaces.

Spiral piercing

An ear spiral is a thick spiral that is usually worn through the earlobe. It is worn in ears that have been stretched and normally held in place only by its own downward pressure. Glass ear spirals are shown but many materials are used. Some designs are quite ornate and may include decorative appendages flaring from the underlying concentric pattern.

Piercing techniques
A variety of techniques are used to pierce ears, ranging from "do it yourself" methods using household items to medically sterile methods using specialized equipment.

A long-standing home method involves using ice as a local anesthetic, a sewing needle as a puncture instrument, a burning match and rubbing alcohol for disinfection, and a semi-soft object, such as a potato, cork, bar of soap or rubber eraser, as a push point. Sewing thread may be drawn through the piercing and tied, as a device for keeping the piercing open during the healing process. Alternatively, a gold stud or wire earring may be directly inserted into the fresh piercing as the initial retaining device. Home methods are often unsafe and risky due to issues of improper sterilization or placement.

Another method for piercing ears, first made popular in the 1960s, was the use of sharpened spring-loaded earrings known as self-piercers, trainers, or sleepers, which gradually pushed through the earlobe. However, these could slip from their initial placement position, often resulting in more discomfort, and many times would not go all the way through the earlobe without additional pressure being applied. This method has fallen into disuse due to the popularity of faster and more successful piercing techniques.

Ear piercing instruments, sometimes called ear-piercing guns, were originally developed for physician use but with modifications became available in retail settings. Today more and more people in the Western world have their ears pierced with an ear piercing instrument in specialty jewellery or accessory stores, or at home using disposable ear piercing instruments. An earlobe piercing performed with an ear piercing instrument is often described as feeling similar to being pinched, or being snapped by a rubber band. Piercing with this method, especially for cartilage piercings, is not recommended by many piercing professionals and physicians, as it can cause blunt force trauma to the skin, and takes far longer to heal than needle piercing. In addition, the vast majority of ear piercing instruments are made of plastic, which means they can never be truly sterilized by use of an Autoclave, increasing chance of infection exponentially. In the case of cartilage piercing, doing it with an ear piercing instrument can shatter the ear cartilage and lead to serious complications.

An alternative which is growing in practice is the use of a hollow piercing needle, as is done in body piercing. The piercer disinfects the earlobe with alcohol and puts a mark on the lobe with a pen. It gives the opportunity to the client to check whether the position is correct or not. Then, the piercer uses a clamp with flat ends and holes at the end to hold the earlobe, with the dot in the middle of the holes. This device will support the skin during the piercing process. A cork can be placed behind the earlobe to stop the movement of the needle after the piercing process, and protect the tip of the needle for the client's comfort. Then, the piercer places the hollow needle perpendicular to the skin's surface and check the position of the needle, to pierce at the desired place and the right angle. The piercing process consists of pushing the needle through the earlobe, until it gets out in the other side. The client has to remain still during all the process. Then, the clamp can be put off. After that, the piercer puts the jewel in the hollow needle and pushes the needle through until the jewel enters into the lobe. Then, the needle is removed and disposed properly. The jewel is attached to the lobe and the piercer disinfects the lobe again.

In tribal cultures and among some neo-primitive body piercing enthusiasts, the piercing is made using other tools, such as animal or plant organics.

Initial healing time for an earlobe piercing performed with an ear piercing instrument is typically six to eight weeks. After that time, earrings can be changed, but if the hole is left unfilled for an extended period of time, there is some risk of the piercing closing. Piercing professionals recommend wearing earrings in the newly pierced ears for at least six months, and sometimes even a full year. Cartilage piercing will usually require more healing time than earlobe piercing, sometimes two to three times as long. After healing, earlobe piercings will shrink to smaller gauges in the prolonged absence of earrings, and in most cases will completely disappear.

Health risks
The health risks with conventional earlobe piercing are common but tend to be minor, particularly if proper technique and hygienic procedures are followed. One study found that up to 35 percent of persons with pierced ears had one or more complications, including minor infection (77 percent of pierced ear sites with complications), allergic reaction (43 percent), keloids (2.5 percent), and traumatic tearing (2.5 percent). Pierced ears are a significant risk factor for contact allergies to the nickel in jewelry. Earlobe tearing during the healing period or after healing is complete can be minimized by not wearing earrings, especially wire-based dangle earrings, during activities in which they are likely to become snagged, such as while playing sports. Also, larger gauge jewelry will lessen the chance of the earring being torn out.

With cartilage piercing, the blunt force of an ear piercing instrument will traumatize the cartilage, and therefore make healing more difficult. Also, because there is substantially less blood flow in ear cartilage than in the earlobe, infection is a much more serious issue. There have been several documented cases of severe infections of the upper ear following piercing with an ear piercing instrument, which required courses of antibiotics to clear up. There are many ways that an infection can occur: the most common way is when the person that got pierced decides to take out the piercing too early. According to the A.M.A.  the proper waiting period to change or take out a piercing with substantially less risk of infection would be three weeks.

For all ear piercings, the use of a sterilized hollow piercing needle tends to minimize the trauma to the tissue and minimize the chances of contracting a bacterial infection during the procedure. As with any invasive procedure, there is always a risk of infection from blood borne pathogens such as hepatitis and HIV. However, modern piercing techniques make this risk extremely small (the risk being greater to the piercer than to the pierced due to the potential splash-back of blood). There has never been a documented case of HIV transmission due to ear/body piercing or tattooing, although there have been instances of the Hepatitis B virus being transmitted through these practices.

Negative effects of wearing earrings in light of research
The most frequent complications connected with wearing earrings are:

 inflammation
 keloids
 loss of tissue by tearing 
 mechanical division of earlobes
 potential skin disorder

Researchers observed a correlation between the piercing of young girls' earlobes and subsequent development of allergies.<ref name="tvn24">{{cite news|url=http://www.tvn24.pl/krakow,50/polscy-naukowcy-ostrzegaja-kolczyki-szkodza-dzieciom,462077.html|trans-title=Polish scientists warn: earrings harm children|language=pl|title=Polscy naukowcy ostrzegają: kolczyki szkodzą dzieciom|work=TVN24.pl|date=2014-08-26|access-date=2015-04-01}}</ref>

In Professor Ewa Czarnobilska's view (the manager of the research team) the main reason of allergy (listed by allergists) is presence of nickel as a component of alloys used in the production of earrings – however the ingredients declared by producer are not significant, because nickel is a standard component of jewellery.

Symptoms of allergy are visible as eczema. This symptom is often justified to be food allergy (e.g. to milk), meanwhile the reason is contact with the earring (precisely nickel ions) with the lymphatic system.

Ceasing of wearing earrings by children does not result in vanishing allergy symptoms. The immune system remembers the presence of nickel ions that existed in someone's blood and lymph. Even though the children ceased wearing earrings, it can appear as an allergic reaction to:

 metal parts of wardrobe
 dental braces
 dental prosthesis
 orthotics
 meals cooked in pots with addition of nickel
 margarine (nickel is a catalyst in hydrogenation of unsaturated fats)
 coins
 chocolate
 nuts
 leguminous vegetables
 wine
 beer

Research studying a sample of 428 pupils, age seven and eight, and sixteen and seventeen noticed that:

 thirty percent of population were allergic to nickel
 allergy occurred for many girls who had started wearing earrings in early childhood

Other symptoms of allergy to nickel are:

 recurring infections
 asthma attacks
 chronic larynxis

See also
 Jewelry wire gauge

References

Further reading
  This source has a summary description of archaeological and artistic finds as of the early 20th century.
 van Cutsem, Anne, A World of Earrings: Africa, Asia, America, Skira, 2001. 
 Holmes, Anita, Pierced and Pretty: The Complete Guide to Ear Piercing, Pierced Earrings, and How to Create Your Own, William Morrow and Co., 1988. 
 Jolly, Penny Howell, "Marked Difference: Earrings and 'The Other' in Fifteenth-Century Flemish Artwork," in Encountering Medieval Textiles and Dress: Objects, Texts, Images, Palgrave Macmillan, 2002, pp. 195–208. 
 Mascetti, Daniela and Triossi, Amanda, Earrings: From Antiquity to the Present, Thames and Hudson, 1999. 
 McNab, Nan, Body Bizarre Body Beautiful, Fireside, 2001. 
 Mercury, Maureen and Haworth, Steve, Pagan Fleshworks: The Alchemy of Body Modification, Park Street Press, 2000. 
 Steinbach, Ronald D., The Fashionable Ear: A History of Ear Piercing Trends for Men and Women, Vantage Press, 1995. 
 Vale, V., Modern Primitives'', RE/Search, 1989.

External links
 
 

Ring
Types of jewellery
Jewellery